Hazazi (also spelled Hazzazi) is an Arabic surname. Notable people with the surname include:

 Majed Hazzazi (born 1988), Saudi footballer
 Naif Hazazi (born 1989), Saudi footballer
 Sulaiman Hazazi (born 2003), Saudi footballer

Arabic-language surnames